Lyne Catherine Jeanne Chardonnet (5 May 1943 – 11 December 1980) was a French actress. She appeared in more than forty films from 1966 to 1981.

Filmography

References

External links 

1943 births
1980 deaths
French film actresses
20th-century French women